Fortune Cookies is the second album by Alana Davis, released in 2001. It peaked at #34 on Billboard's Heatseekers Album chart.

Track listing

References

2001 albums
Elektra Records albums
Alana Davis albums
Albums produced by the Neptunes